Adam Michał Lisewski (20 February 1944 – 23 February 2023) was a Polish fencer. He won a bronze medal in the team foil event at the 1968 Summer Olympics.

Lisewski died in Warsaw on 23 February 2023, at the age of 79.

References

1944 births
2023 deaths
Polish male fencers
Olympic fencers of Poland
Fencers at the 1968 Summer Olympics
Olympic bronze medalists for Poland
Fencers from Warsaw
Olympic medalists in fencing
Medalists at the 1968 Summer Olympics
21st-century Polish people
20th-century Polish people